Wakabunga is an extinct and unattested Australian Aboriginal language of Queensland. The one word list labeled as 'Wakabunga' turned out to be Kalkatungu.

References

Kalkatungic languages
Extinct languages of Queensland
Unclassified languages of Australia